The 2000–01 Michigan Wolverines men's basketball team represented the University of Michigan in intercollegiate college basketball during the 2000–01 season. The team played its home games in the Crisler Arena in Ann Arbor, Michigan, and was a member of the Big Ten Conference.  Under the direction of head coach Brian Ellerbe, the team finished tied for eighth in the Big Ten Conference.  The team earned a ten seed but was defeated in the first round of the 2000 Big Ten Conference men's basketball tournament.  The team failed to earn an invitation to either the 2001 National Invitation Tournament or the 2001 NCAA Men's Division I Basketball Tournament. The team was unranked for all eighteen weeks of Associated Press Top Twenty-Five Poll, and it also ended the season unranked in the final USA Today/CNN Poll.  The team had a 2–8 record against ranked opponents, with both of its victories coming against conference foe Iowa who was ranked #14 at the time of the first meeting on January 20 at Carver-Hawkeye Arena, which resulted in a 70–69 victory, and #25 at the time of the February 14 meeting at Crisler Arena that Michigan won 95–85.

Josh Asselin and Mike Gotfredson served as team co-captains, and LaVell Blanchard and Bernard Robinson, Jr. shared team MVP  honors.  The team's leading scorers were LaVell Blanchard (499 points), Bernard Robinson, Jr. (404 points) and Josh Asselin (269 points).  The leading rebounders were Blanchard (235), Asselin (167) and Chris Young (138).

Chris Young won the Big Ten Conference statistical championship for field goal percentage with a 64.0% mark in all of Michigan's games.

In the 2001 Big Ten Conference men's basketball tournament at the United Center from March 8–11, Michigan was seeded tenth.  In the first round they lost to number 7 Penn State 82–80.

Team players drafted into the NBA

References

Michigan Wolverines men's basketball seasons
Michigan Wolverines
Michigan
Michigan